Joona Jääskeläinen (born 5 September 1996) is a Finnish professional ice hockey player who currently plays professionally for HC Košice of the Slovak Extraliga.

Career statistics

Regular season and playoffs

Awards and honors

References

External links

 

1996 births
Living people
People from Imatra
Finnish ice hockey right wingers
Finnish expatriate ice hockey players in the Czech Republic
Finnish expatriate ice hockey players in Slovakia
Kokkolan Hermes players
SaiPa players
Imatran Ketterä players
Mikkelin Jukurit players
HC '05 Banská Bystrica players
BK Mladá Boleslav players
HC Slovan Bratislava players
HC Košice players
Sportspeople from South Karelia